Parker Yancey McCollum (born June 15, 1992) is an American Americana and country singer-songwriter based in Texas. The owner of PYM Music, he released his first single and EP in 2013, and his full-length debut album The Limestone Kid was released on February 24, 2015. The Austin Chronicle gave the release 3.5/5 stars, writing that "it's too early to declare The Limestone Kid debut of the year, but it's already one to beat," and comparing McCollum's music to that of Charlie Robison. McCollum and his backing band announced a 2015 tour of Texas in support of the album, performing at events such as RedGorilla Music Fest. McCollum released the EP Probably Wrong: Session One on July 7, 2017, and followed it with Probably Wrong: Session Two on September 8, 2017. The full Probably Wrong album was released on November 10, 2017. His major-label debut album Gold Chain Cowboy was released July 30, 2021.

Early life
Parker McCollum was born in 1992 and raised in Conroe, Texas near Houston. Early in his life he listened to classic country musicians such as Willie Nelson, Buck Owens and Porter Wagoner, and his family introduced him to red dirt musicians such as Cross Canadian Ragweed, Pat Green and Chris Knight. Working summers on a cattle ranch with his grandfather, McCollum was further exposed to artists such as Bob Dylan, Townes Van Zandt, and Steve Earle. McCollum has referred to neotraditional country pioneer and fellow Texan George Strait as his musical hero, and has covered several Strait songs in his performances.

In elementary school McCollum learned violin and played in the school orchestra, and he started learning guitar at age thirteen. At thirteen he also began writing his own music, mixing genres such as Texas country music, Americana, and indie rock. According to McCollum, he was greatly influenced by his older brother Tyler's lyrics and songwriting. After performing at a number of local open mics with his guitar, he started learning harmonica at age fifteen. By sixteen he was securing gigs at local venues, and he continued to work on his material through high school, where he attended The Woodlands College Park High School. After graduation he moved to Austin, Texas, where he began attending college.

Music career

Singles and A Red Town View (2013–2014)
McCollum continued to perform as a singer-songwriter while living in Austin, and he also went on his first tour with the Texas band Six Market Blvd. The tour inspired the lyrics for his first single, "Highway", which was released on June 5, 2013, and later included on his debut EP A Red Town View. Released on November 19, 2013, the EP was produced by Corby Schaub, who is also known as the former guitarist for Ryan Bingham.

The Limestone Kid (2015)
McCollum's debut album The Limestone Kid was recorded at Cedar Creek Recording in Austin, and includes styles such as Americana, Texas country, and folk-rock. McCollum handles vocals, acoustic guitar and harmonica, and his Austin-based backing band includes Kurt Grien on lead guitar, Jason Newberry on bass, Will Hoback on drums, and Charlie Magnone on keyboards and piano. Multi-instrumentalist Corby Schaub produced the album. Lloyd Maines contributed pedal steel guitar.

McCollum wrote or co-wrote nine of the eleven tracks, and two of the songs were written by McCollum's family members. Many of the lyrics are about his experiences growing up in Limestone County, Texas, and the album's title is a reference to the nickname he earned working summers at a Limestone County ranch. The first single on the album, McCollum's original track "Meet You in the Middle," was released to Texas radio prior to the album.

The full-length debut album The Limestone Kid was released on February 24, 2015. The Austin Chronicle gave it 3.5/5 stars, writing that "it's too early to declare The Limestone Kid debut of the year, but it's already one to beat," and comparing McCollum's music to that of Charlie Robison. Texas Music Pickers wrote that "[McCollum's] stories are not all happy, or sad, or even have resolution; they’re just straight-forward accounts of life. It’s like Todd Snider meets Whiskeytown." "High Above The Water" reached the top 50 of the Texas Regional Radio Report.

McCollum and his backing band announced a tour of Texas in support of the album, with February and March dates set for venues in Houston, Austin, and Fort Worth. The band performed at the RedGorilla Music Fest, and Texas Crawfish and Music Festival in Spring, Texas. He won the T-Birds Songwriter Award, and in 2015 performed at Larry Joe Taylor's Texas Music Festival,

Probably Wrong (2017)
McCollum released an EP titled Probably Wrong: Session One on July 7, 2017. It was his first release to appear on the Billboard charts, debuting at No. 6 on Heatseekers Albums, No. 14 on Independent Albums chart, and No. 15 on Country Album Sales chart, with 2,000 copies sold in the US in its first week. Probably Wrong Session Two was released shortly after on September 8, 2017. The full 10-track Probably Wrong album was released on November 10, 2017, and includes all the previous sessions which features the singles "I Can't Breathe" and "Misunderstood", plus two new tracks, including "Hell of a Year". The full Probably Wrong album was produced by Grammy Award-winning, Lloyd Maines. McCollum toured through the end of 2017 to promote his newest releases.

MCA Nashville
McCollum signed with Universal Music Group on June 27, 2019. His first single under the label was "Pretty Heart". On October 16, 2020, McCollum released the EP, Hollywood Gold.

Gold Chain Cowboy (2021) 
On July 30, 2021, McCollum released his third studio album to mostly positive reviews. SavingCountryMusic.Com praised his songwriting, citing "the strength of the choruses, and the unmistakable appeal these songs will find within their key demographic." Country Swag states that this album is "sonically more polished than his first two albums," and that what "Parker McCollum does best on Gold Chain Cowboy is refrain from sounding like everyone else on country radio."
In March 2022 he went on to win the New Male Artist of the Year at the American Country Music Awards.

In March 2022, McCollum performed for the first time at the Houston Livestock Show and Rodeo to attendance of 73,243 rodeo attendees.

"Handle On You" (2022) 
On August 5, 2022 McCollum released "Handle On You" as a single.

Musical style and influences
Parker McCollum's music incorporates genres as diverse as blues, roots rock, soul and folk rock, though his albums have primarily been described as country and Americana. His music has received rotation on Americana radio stations in particular, and he has referenced Americana singer-songwriter Ryan Bingham as a significant influence. Other stylistic influences include alternative country musician Ryan Adams and blues and folk artist Townes Van Zandt, and blues/pop artist John Mayer.

Discography

Albums

EPs

Singles

Promotional singles

Other appearances

Awards and nominations

Notes

References

Further reading

External links

ParkerMcCollum.com

Living people
1992 births
American country singer-songwriters
People from Conroe, Texas
Musicians from Austin, Texas
Country musicians from Texas
American male singer-songwriters
Singer-songwriters from Texas
MCA Records artists